Garnet is a mineral.

Garnet(s) may also refer to:

Characters
 Garnet (Steven Universe)
 Garnet (Jewelpet), Persian cat character 
 Garnet Til Alexandros XVII in Final Fantasy IX
Garnet, one of the identical twins in the 1995 Jacqueline Wilson book Double Act

Music
 Garnet Crow, a Japanese Rock band named after the gemstone
 Garnet (ガーネット Gānetto), song by Japanese singer Hanako Oku
 Garnet ~Kindan no Sono E~, song/single by Malice Mizer

Places
 Garnet, California
 Garnet, Michigan
 Garnet, Montana
 Garnet, Wisconsin

Other uses
 Garnet (color), any of various dark reds
 Garnet (name)
 "Garnet," a common variety of sweet potato
 Garnet OS, a discontinued mobile operating system
 Garnets (volume), obsolete Imperial Russian unit of dry volume
 Swarthmore Garnet, nickname of Swarthmore College
 Garnets, team name of Haddon Heights High School